San Simón is a Peruvian football club based in the city of Moquegua, Peru. The club is the biggest of Moquegua city.

History
In 2013, the club won the Copa Perú against Unión Huaral from Lima, thus ascending to Peru's Torneo Descentralizado in 2014.

Honours

National
Copa Perú: 1
Winners (1): 2013

Regional
Región VII: 1
Winners (1): 2013

Liga Departamental de Moquegua:
Runner-up (1): 2013

Liga Provincial de Mariscal Nieto:
Winners (2): 2011, 2012
Runner-up (1): 2013

Liga Distrital de Moquegua:
Winners (1): 2012
Runner-up (2): 2011, 2013

Liga Distrital de Magdalena del Mar:
Runner-up (1): 2018

See also
List of football clubs in Peru
Peruvian football league system

External links

Football clubs in Peru
Association football clubs established in 1983